The 2022 United States House of Representatives elections in Pennsylvania were held on November 8, 2022, to elect representatives for the seventeen seats in Pennsylvania (reduced from 18 in the redistricting cycle following the 2020 United States Census).

Pennsylvania's legislature enacted new district maps in January 2022, which were promptly vetoed by Governor Tom Wolf. The state supreme court took control of the process and selected a map in February 2022. After the court rejected several legal challenges in March, the new district boundaries were used in the May 2022 primary elections. Democrats won the majority of seats in the state for the first time since 2008.

District 1

The 1st district is based in the northern suburbs of Philadelphia, including all of Bucks County and parts of Montgomery County. The district was mostly unchanged by redistricting. It has an even PVI and voted for Joe Biden by 5 points in 2020. Republican Brian Fitzpatrick, who has represented the district since 2017, was most recently re-elected in 2022 with 54.9% of the vote.

Republican primary

Candidates

Nominee
Brian Fitzpatrick, incumbent U.S. Representative

Eliminated in primary
Alex Entin, procurement manager

Withdrawn
Caroline Avery, personal antiquities buyer (running as a Libertarian)
Bradley Lanning, realtor
Dasha Pruett, photographer and nominee for Pennsylvania's 5th congressional district in 2020

Endorsements

Results

Democratic primary

Candidates

Nominee
Ashley Ehasz, former U.S. Army pilot

Withdrawn
Eric Bruno, former auto mechanic
Paul Fermo, former U.S. Navy pilot

Endorsements

Results

Independent and third-party candidates

Libertarian Party

Disqualified
Caroline Avery, personal antiquities buyer (originally ran as a Republican)

Endorsements

Green Party

Withdrawn
Henry Conoly, activist

General election

Predictions

Endorsements

Polling

Results

District 2

The 2nd district is based in central and northeastern Philadelphia. The district was mostly unchanged by redistricting. It has a PVI of D+22 and voted for Joe Biden by 43 points in 2020. Democrat Brendan Boyle, who has represented the district since 2019, was most recently re-elected in 2022 with 75.7% of the vote.

Democratic primary

Candidates

Nominee
Brendan Boyle, incumbent U.S. Representative

Declined
Sharif Street, state senator from the 3rd district and son of former Philadelphia Mayor John F. Street

Endorsements

Polling

Results

Republican primary

Candidates

Nominee
Aaron Bashir

Results

General election

Predictions

Results

District 3

The 3rd district is based in west and south Philadelphia. The district was mostly unchanged by redistricting. It has a PVI of D+40, making it the second most democratic leaning district in the nation (behind NY-13), and voted for Joe Biden by 81 points. Democrat Dwight Evans, who has represented the district since 2019, was most recently re-elected in 2022 with 95.1% of the vote.

Democratic primary

Candidates

Nominee
Dwight Evans, incumbent U.S. Representative

Eliminated in primary
Michael Cogbill
Alexandra Hunt, public health researcher

Declined
Helen Gym, Philadelphia City Councilor

Endorsements

Results

Independent and third-party candidates

Socialist Workers Party

Qualified for ballot
Christopher Hoeppner, freight train conductor

General election

Predictions

Results

District 4

The 4th district is based in the western suburbs of Philadelphia, including most of Montgomery County and parts of Berks County. The district was mostly unchanged by redistricting. It has a PVI of D+7 and voted for Joe Biden by 19 points in 2020. Democrat Madeleine Dean, who has represented the district since 2019, was most recently re-elected in 2022, winning 61.3% of the vote in the general election.

Democratic primary

Candidates

Nominee
Madeleine Dean, incumbent U.S. Representative

Endorsements

Results

Republican primary

Candidates

Nominee
Christian Nascimento, vice president of product at Comcast and former Methacton School Board president

Eliminated in primary
Daniel Burton

Results

General election

Predictions

Endorsements

Results

District 5

The 5th district is based in the southwestern suburbs of Philadelphia, including all of Delaware County, parts of Montgomery County, and parts of south Philadelphia. The district was mostly unchanged by redistricting. It has a PVI of D+14 and voted for Joe Biden by 32 points in 2020. Democrat Mary Gay Scanlon, who has represented the district since 2018, was most recently re-elected in 2022 winning 65.1% of the vote in the general election.

Democratic primary

Candidates

Nominee
Mary Gay Scanlon, incumbent U.S. Representative

Endorsements

Results

Republican primary

Candidates

Nominee
David Galluch, Navy veteran

Results

Independent and third-party candidates

Libertarian Party

Filed paperwork
Robert Margus

General election

Predictions

Results

District 6

The 6th district includes all of Chester County and the city of Reading in Berks County. The district was mostly unchanged by redistricting. It has a PVI of D+5 and voted for Joe Biden by 15 points in 2020. Democrat Chrissy Houlahan, who has represented the district since 2019, was most recently re-elected in 2022 garnering 58.3% of the vote in the general election.

Democratic primary

Candidates

Nominee
Chrissy Houlahan, incumbent U.S. Representative

Endorsements

Results

Republican primary

Candidates

Nominee
Guy Ciarrocchi, CEO of the Chester County Chamber of Business & Industry and former chief of staff to Lieutenant Governor Jim Cawley

Eliminated in primary
Steve Fanelli, businessman
Regina Mauro, businesswoman
Ron Vogel, realtor

Endorsements

Results

General election

Predictions

Endorsements

Results

District 7

The 7th district is based in the Lehigh Valley, including all of Lehigh, Northampton, and Carbon counties and a small sliver of Monroe County. The district was modestly altered by redistricting, losing Stroudsburg in exchange for Carbon County. This made the district more conservative, with a PVI of R+2, but it voted for Joe Biden by 0.6 points in 2020. Democrat Susan Wild, a representative since 2018, was most recently re-elected in 2022 winning 51.0% of the vote.

During the campaign, a research firm contracted by the Democratic Congressional Campaign Committee inappropriately obtained the military records of candidate Kevin Dellicker.

Democratic primary

Candidates

Nominee
Susan Wild, incumbent U.S. Representative

Endorsements

Results

Republican primary

Candidates

Nominee

Eliminated in primary
Kevin Dellicker, businessman and former National Guardsman

Withdrew
Ryan Mackenzie, state representative from the 134th district

Endorsements

Results

General election

Predictions

Polling

Results

District 8

The 8th district is based in Northeast Pennsylvania, specifically the Wyoming Valley and Pocono Mountains, including all of Lackawanna, Wayne, and Pike counties, and most of Luzerne and Monroe counties. The district added Stroudsburg in redistricting, making it slightly more liberal. It has a PVI of R+4 and voted for Donald Trump by 3 points in 2020. Democrat Matt Cartwright, who has represented the district since 2013, was most recently re-elected in 2022 garnering 51.2% of the vote in the general election.

Democratic primary

Candidates

Nominee
Matt Cartwright, incumbent U.S. Representative

Endorsements

Results

Republican primary

Candidates

Nominee
Jim Bognet, former senior vice president for communications of the Export–Import Bank of the United States and nominee for Pennsylvania's 8th congressional district in 2020

Eliminated in primary

Withdrawn
Teddy Daniels, former police officer and U.S. Army veteran (ran for Lt. Governor)

Endorsements

Results

General election

Predictions

Endorsements

Debates and forums

Polling
Aggregate polls

Graphical summary

Generic Democrat vs. generic Republican

Results

District 9

The 9th district is based in North Central Pennsylvania east of the Appalachian Divide, including Williamsport, Bloomsburg, and Lebanon. The district kept most of its territory and added much of the now defunct 12th district in redistricting. It has a PVI of R+21 and voted for Donald Trump by 37 points in 2020. Republican Dan Meuser, who has represented the district since 2019, was re-elected with 66.3% of the vote in 2020. Meuser is running for re-election. Republican Fred Keller, who has represented the 12th district since 2019, was re-elected with 70.8% of the vote in 2020 and redistricted into the 15th district, but switched to run in the 9th district. However, on February 28, Keller announced that he would retire instead of go through a primary against Meuser. Meuser went on to win the general election in 2022, garnering 69.3% of the vote.

Republican primary

Candidates

Nominee
Dan Meuser, incumbent U.S. Representative

Withdrawn
Fred Keller, incumbent U.S. Representative

Endorsements

Results

Democratic primary

Candidates

Nominee
Amanda Waldman, Medicare financial representative

Results

Independents and third-party candidates

Libertarian Party

Withdrawn
Liz Terwilliger, candidate for Pennsylvania's 12th congressional district in 2020

General election

Predictions

Endorsements

Debates and forums

Results

District 10

The 10th district is based in the Harrisburg and York areas, including all of Dapuhin County, most of Cumberland County, and the northern half of York County. The district was mostly unchanged by redistricting. It has a PVI of R+5 and voted for Donald Trump by 4 points in 2020. Republican Scott Perry, who has represented the district since 2013, was most recently re-elected in 2022 winning 53.8% of the vote.

Republican primary

Candidates

Nominee
Scott Perry, incumbent U.S. representative and chair of the Freedom Caucus

Did not file
Brian Allen, clinical psychologist

Endorsements

Results

Democratic primary

Candidates

Nominee
Shamaine Daniels, at-large member of Harrisburg city council (2014–present)

Eliminated in primary
Rick Coplen, Carlisle school board member, retired Army officer, and candidate for Pennsylvania State Senate in 2020

Declined
Tom Brier, attorney and candidate for this seat in 2020

Results

General election

Predictions

Polling

Results

District 11

The 11th district is based in Pennsylvania Dutch Country, including all of Lancaster County and the southern half of York County. The district was mostly unchanged by redistricting. It has a PVI of R+14 and voted for Donald Trump by 21 points in 2020. Republican Lloyd Smucker, who has represented the district since 2017, was most recently re-elected in 2022, winning 61.5% of the vote.

Republican primary

Candidates

Nominee
Lloyd Smucker, incumbent U.S. Representative

Endorsements

Results

Democratic primary

Candidates

Nominee
Bob Hollister, Eastern Lancaster County School Superintendent (2008–2022)

Endorsements

Results

Independents and other parties

Libertarian Party

Failed to qualify for ballot
Dave Womack, Dallastown Borough Council-elect, criminal justice activist

General election

Predictions

Endorsements

Results

District 12

The 12th district is based in the city of Pittsburgh and its eastern and southern suburbs, including parts of Allegheny and Westmoreland counties. The district was numbered the 18th district before redistricting, with the old 12th district now eliminated. The district expanded into parts of Westmoreland County due to redistricting. It has a PVI of D+8 and voted for Joe Biden by 20 points in 2020. Democrat Mike Doyle has represented the district since 1995. He was re-elected with 69.3% of the vote in 2020. Doyle announced that he will not seek re-election in 2022. He was succeeded in Congress by Pennsylvania State House Representative Summer Lee who was elected with 56.2% of the vote.

Democratic primary

Candidates

Nominee
Summer Lee, state representative from the 34th district

Eliminated in primary
Steve Irwin, attorney, chair of the United States Commission on Civil Rights for Pennsylvania and former commissioner of the Pennsylvania Department of Banking & Securities
William Parker, businessman, activist and 2021 candidate for Pittsburgh mayor
Jeff Woodard, executive director at Pennsylvania College Access Program

Withdrew
Stephanie Fox, former Brentwood city councilor (endorsed Irwin, ran for state representative)
Bhavini Patel, Edgewood borough councilor

Declined
Mike Doyle, incumbent U.S. Representative (endorsed Irwin)

Endorsements

Debates and forums

Polling

Results

Republican primary

Candidates

Nominee
Mike Doyle, Plum city councilor (no relation to Democratic incumbent Mike Doyle)

Results

General election

Predictions

Endorsements

Polling

Results

District 13

The 13th district is based in South Central Pennsylvania, including Johnstown, Altoona, and Gettysburg. The district was mostly unchanged by redistricting, though it did lose its territory in Somerset and Westmoreland counties in exchange for Johnstown. The district has a PVI of R+25 and voted for Donald Trump by 45 points in 2020. Republican John Joyce, who has represented the district since 2019, was most recently re-elected in 2022 after being unopposed in the primary and general elections.

Republican primary

Candidates

Nominee
John Joyce, incumbent U.S. Representative

Results

Democratic primary

Candidates

Declined
Mark Critz, western region director of the Pennsylvania Department of Agriculture and former U.S. Representative from Pennsylvania's 12th congressional district (2010–2013) (won nomination via write-in, but declined to run)

Results

General election

Predictions

Results

District 14

The 14th district is based in Southwest Pennsylvania, including all of Washington, Greene, and Fayette counties, most of Indiana and Somerset counties, and parts of Westmoreland County. The district was mostly unchanged by redistricting, though it did have to expand eastward to take in more population. It has a PVI of R+18 and voted for Donald Trump by 32 points in 2020. Republican Guy Reschenthaler, who has represented the district since 2019, was most recently re-elected in 2022 having been unopposed in the primary and general elections.

Republican primary

Candidates

Nominee
Guy Reschenthaler, incumbent U.S. Representative

Endorsements

Results

General election

Predictions

Results

District 15

The 15th district is based in North Central Pennsylvania west of the Appalachian Divide, including State College, Lock Haven, and Bradford.The district was mostly unchanged by redistricting, though it did lose Johnstown in exchange for the parts of State College formerly in the 12th district. It has a PVI of R+20 and voted for Donald Trump by 37 points in 2020. Republican Glenn Thompson, who has represented the district since 2009, was most recently re-elected in 2022 receiving 69.9% of the vote.

Republican primary

Candidates

Nominee
Glenn Thompson, incumbent U.S. Representative

Declined
Fred Keller, incumbent U.S. Representative (filed to run in Pennsylvania's 9th congressional district, then announced retirement)

Endorsements

Results

General election

Predictions

Results

District 16

The 16th district is based in Northwest Pennsylvania, including all of Erie, Crawford, Mercer, Lawrence, and Butler counties and parts of Venango County. The district was mostly unchanged by redistricting. It has a PVI of R+13 and voted for Donald Trump by 21 points in 2020. Republican Mike Kelly, who has represented the district since 2011, was most recently re-elected in 2022, winning 59.4% of the vote in the general election.

Republican primary

Candidates

Nominee
Mike Kelly, incumbent U.S. Representative

Endorsements

Results

Democratic primary

Candidates

Nominee
Dan Pastore, FishUSA founder

Eliminated in primary
Rick Telesz, farmer

Endorsements

Results

General election

Predictions

Results

District 17

The 17th district is based in the western and northern suburbs of Pittsburgh, including parts of Allegheny County and all of Beaver County. The district was mostly unchanged by redistricting. It has an even PVI and voted for Joe Biden by 6 points in 2020. Democrat Conor Lamb, who represented the district since 2018, was re-elected in 2020 with 51.1% of the vote. He retired to run for the U.S. Senate in 2022. Lamb was succeeded by former Navy Officer Chris Deluzio, who was elected in 2022 by winning 53.4% of the vote in the general election.

Democratic primary

Candidates

Nominee
Chris Deluzio, attorney and policy director of University of Pittsburgh Institute for Cyber Law, Policy and Security

Eliminated in primary
Sean Meloy, senior political advisor for Victory Fund

Declined
Conor Lamb, incumbent U.S. Representative (ran for U.S. Senate)

Endorsements

Results

Republican primary

Candidates

Nominee
Jeremy Shaffer, former Ross Township commissioner and nominee for State Senate District 38 in 2018

Eliminated in primary
Kathy Coder, political activist and 2018 lieutenant gubernatorial candidate
Jason Killmeyer, conservative writer and national security expert

Results

General election

Endorsements

Predictions

Polling

Generic Democrat vs. generic Republican

Results

Notes 

Partisan clients

References 

2022
Pennsylvania
United States House of Representatives